Kip Tyler and the Flips were an American rock and roll band best known for recording "Jungle Hop."

Beginnings
The group started in Los Angeles, California in 1957, right after Kip Tyler was no longer needed for the band, 'Jimmy Daley and The Ding-A-Lings', which had produced the soundtrack songs in connection to the 1956 movie Rock, Pretty Baby.

Success
Their first record was "Let's Monkey Around" (b/c "Vagabond Mama"); recorded at Starla Records. The group recorded at Challenge Records and found more success from their singles produced there. In early 1958, Challenge released their first hit "Jungle Hop".

Ebb Records
Later in 1958, they recorded at Ebb Records with another single: "She's My Witch" (b/c "Rumble Rock"), which was also successful. In 1959, they recorded another one there called "Oh Linda" (b/c "Hali-Lou"), which was their last record together.

Band members
Some noteworthy members joined this band, including drummer Sandy Nelson and future Wrecking Crew members Larry Knechtel (later of Bread) and guitarist Mike Deasy.

References

Musical groups from Los Angeles
Rock music groups from California